Chelsie Alexa Schweers (born June 11, 1989) is an American professional basketball player.

College
Schweers played for Christopher Newport from 2007 to 2011, leaving as the schools all-time leader in scoring and three-pointers made. In 2017, she inducted into the USA South Conference Hall of Fame.

Club career
Schweers first professional stop was with Panathinaikos in the Greek A1 Ethniki in January 2012. In 12 games with the club, Schweers averaged 13.0 points and 26.0 minutes per game.

She signed with Toowoomba in the QBL in 2013, and went on to average 28.2 points per game and earn selection in the QBL All League Team.

Schweers signed with Hamar of the Úrvalsdeild kvenna in January 2014, replacing Di´Amber Johnson. On February 26, 2014, Schweers scored 54 points in a victory against Keflavík. After the Úrvalsdeild season ended, Schweers signed with the Ipswich Force of the Queensland Basketball League.

In 2016, Schweers signed with the Hobart Chargers of the SEABL where she led the league in scoring and three-point percentage.

In June 2016, Schweers returned to the Úrvalsdeild and signed with Stjarnan. On November, Scwheers had a triple-double against Valur. On December 1, Stjarnan announced that Schweers would miss the rest of the year due to a broken hand and that she had played the last three games with the injury. On December 29, Stjarnan released Schweers, despite her leading the league in scoring with 31.0 points per game, citing her injury and Stjarnan's need for a point guard. On January 8, she signed with Úrvalsdeild club Haukar. On March 4, Haukar released Schweers after averaging 22.0 points in 7 games. In 16 games for both teams, she averaged a league leading 27.1 points per game.

She spent the 2016–2017 season with CAB Madeira in Portugal's Liga Feminina, averaging 15.9 points and 4.5 rebounds.

In April 2018, Schweers joined Sutherland Sharks of the Waratah League. On August 15, she was named the Waratah League Most Valuable Player after averaging league leading 29.6 points along with 6.0 rebounds and 4.4 assists for the season.

In February 2019, Schweers signed with the Eltham Wildcats of the Australian NBL1. In 20 games for the Wildcats, Schweers averaged 23.1 points and 4.3 rebounds.

Schweers spent the 2020–2021 season with AD Vagos where she averaged 19.4 points, 4.4 rebounds and 2.9 assists in 20 games in the Liga Feminina de Basquetebol.

Awards, titles and accomplishments

Individual awards
QBL Most Valuable Player: 2015
QBL All League Team (3): 2013, 2014, 2015
Waratah League Most Valuable Player: 2018

Accomplishments
USA South Athletic Conference Hall of Fame: 2017
Úrvalsdeild kvenna scoring champion: 2016
SEABL scoring champion: 2016
Waratah League scoring champion: 2018

References

External links
Icelandic statistics at kki.is
SEABL statistics at sportstg.com
Profile at eurobasket.com
CNU profile at cnusports.com
Sutherland Sharks profile
NBL profile at nbl1.com.au

1989 births
Living people
American expatriate basketball people in Greece
American expatriate basketball people in Australia
American expatriate basketball people in Iceland
American expatriate basketball people in Portugal
Basketball players from Virginia
Hamar women's basketball players
Haukar women's basketball players
Panathinaikos WBC players
Sportspeople from Chesapeake, Virginia
Stjarnan women's basketball players
Úrvalsdeild kvenna basketball players